The year 1994 in archaeology involved some significant events.

Excavations
 National Institute of Anthropology and History excavations at Maya site of Chacchoben begin
 Ruth Shady's work on the Norte Chico civilization site at Caral in Peru begins
 Martin Carver's excavations of an early medieval Pictish monastery at Portmahomack, Scotland, begin

Publications
 Alan K. Bowman – Life and Letters on the Roman Frontier: Vindolanda and its People (British Museum).
 Marc Bermann – Lukurmata: Household Archaeology in Prehispanic Bolivia (Princeton University Press).
 Luigi Luca Cavalli-Sforza, Paolo Menozzi and Alberto Piazza – The History and Geography of Human Genes (Princeton University Press).
 Gillian Hutchinson – Medieval Ships and Shipping (Leicester University Press).
 Naomi F. Miller and Kathryn L. Gleason (ed.) – The Archaeology of Garden and Field (University of Pennsylvania Press).
 John Schofield and Alan Vince – Medieval Towns (Leicester University Press).

Finds
 26 June – British submarine , lost on sea trials in 1943, is rediscovered in the Sound of Bute off the west coast of Scotland.
 Late – Marine archaeologists led by Jean-Yves Empereur find remains of the Lighthouse of Alexandria in Egypt.
 December
 Spotted horses and human hands, Pech Merle cave, Dordogne, France (painted c. 16000 BC).
 Wall painting with horses, rhinoceroses and aurochs, Chauvet Cave, Vallon-Pont-d'Arc, Ardèche Gorges, France (made c. 25,000–17,000 BC).
 Kafkania pebble.
 Gold coins and jewellery discovered at Salcombe Cannon Wreck site off the coast of south-west England.
 Diver Colin Martin discovers the wreck of the Hanover (built 1757) off the coast of Cornwall.
 Sannai-Maruyama Site discovered at Aomori, northern Honshu, Japan (mainly of Jōmon period).
 Recovery of Homo antecessor skeletal remains from the Trinchera Dolina at the archaeological site of Atapuerca in northern Spain begins; these are the oldest known hominid fossils found in western Europe (between 850,000 and 780,000 years old).
 'Ardi', the fossilized skeletal remains of a female Ardipithecus ramidus, discovered at Aramis, Ethiopia, in the Afar Depression, the oldest known hominid fossil (4.4 million years old).
 First of the Schöningen spears.

Other events
 16 January – British archaeological television series Time Team first shown on Channel 4.
 12 March – Kabul Museum building hit by rocket fire and destroyed.
 ASPRO chronology published.
 The British Library acquires the Kharosti scrolls, the oldest collection of Buddhist manuscripts in the world.

Deaths
 10 March – Rupert Bruce-Mitford, English archaeologist (b. 1914)
 27 March – Elisabeth Schmid, German archaeologist and osteologist (b. 1912)
 8 September – Margaret Guido, English archaeologist (b. 1912)
 10 October – Richard J. C. Atkinson, English archaeologist and prehistorian (b. 1920)

References

Archaeology, 1994 In
Archaeology by year
Archaeology, 1994 In
Archaeology